The  were a group of 19 destroyers built for the Imperial Japanese Navy during World War II. The IJN called them  from their plan name. No ships of the class survived the war.

Background
The Yūgumo class was a repeat of the preceding  with minor improvements that increased their anti-aircraft capabilities. The first 11 ships of the class were ordered as part of the 1939 4th Naval Armaments Supplement Programme. Another 16 ships (the Hayanami sub-class) were ordered as ships #340 to #355 as part of the 1941 Rapid Naval Armaments Supplement Programme, but of these eight were canceled before being laid down. Another eight ships (the Kai-Yūgumo sub-class) were planned as ships #5041 to #5048 under the 1942 Modified 5th Naval Armaments Supplement Programme, but these were also canceled.

Design and description
The Yūgumo class was 45 tons heavier and a few feet longer than the Kagerō class, distinguishable in silhouette primarily by the shape of the bridge. The Yūgumo class had a forward slope on the bridge, which was intended to reduce wind resistance and improve stability. Another difference was that the Yūgumo-class vessels were built by three different shipyards, and there were minor differences between individual ships, depending on the builder and when the ship was built.

Their crew numbered 228 officers and enlisted men.

The ships had two Kampon geared steam turbines, each driving one propeller shaft, using steam provided by three Kampon water-tube boilers.

The main battery of the Yūgumo class consisted of six Type 3  guns in three twin-gun turrets, one superfiring pair aft and one turret forward of the superstructure. The guns were in a new type of mount (known as the "D" mount) which was able to elevate up to 75° to increase their performance against aircraft; however, their slow rate of fire, slow traversing speed, and the lack of any sort of high-angle fire-control system meant that they were virtually useless as anti-aircraft guns. The ships were also armed with eight  torpedo tubes in a two quadruple traversing mounts; one reload was carried for each tube. Their anti-submarine weapons comprised two depth charge throwers for which 36 depth charges were carried.

As built, the Yūgumo class had four Type 96  anti-aircraft guns in two twin-mounts forward of the aft smokestack. as with other destroyer classes, as the Pacific War progressed, anti-aircraft armaments were increased. From 1943, two triple-mounts replaced the twins aft and one twin-mount Type 96 was added forward of the bridge and a Type 22 radar. Units surviving into 1944 had a second pair of 25mm triple-mounts added on a platform behind the forward smokestack. The six units surviving into late 1944 received up to twelve additional single-mount Type 96s and a Type 13 radar.  also received a number of Type 93 13mm machine guns.

Operational history
The Yūgumo class  were considered elite units and always assigned to escort primary fleet units. They were all lost during the Pacific War.

Ships in class

Notes

References
 
 
 
 
 , History of Pacific War Vol.51 The truth of Imperial Japanese Vessels Histories 2, Gakken (Japan), August 2005, 
 Collection of writings by Sizuo Fukui Vol.5, Stories of Japanese Destroyers, Kōjinsha (Japan) 1993, 
 Model Art Extra No.340, Drawings of Imperial Japanese Naval Vessels Part-1, Model Art Co. Ltd. (Japan), October 1989, Book code 08734-10
 The Maru Special, Japanese Naval Vessels No.41 Japanese Destroyers I, Ushio Shobō (Japan), July 1980, Book code 68343-42

External links

 http://www.combinedfleet.com/yugumo_n.htm

Destroyer classes